Ropati Pitoitua (born April 6, 1985) is a former American football defensive end. He was signed by the New York Jets as an undrafted free agent in 2008. He played college football at Washington State. Pitoitua has also played for the Kansas City Chiefs and Tennessee Titans.

Early years 
Pitoitua was born in American Samoa to Sooalo Ropati and Faipine Pitoitua. He has 1 brother and 4 sisters. He played football and basketball at Clover Park High School in Lakewood, Washington, although he did not pick up football until his junior season. In 2002, he earned two football letters, in addition to being named the Seamount League Defensive Player of the Year.

College career 
He played in 36 games (25 starts), posting 116 tackles, (19 for losses) and 8.5 sacks in four seasons at Washington State and was named WSU's Leon Bender Award winner as Cougars' Defensive Lineman of the Year as senior when he started 11 games at defensive tackle and one at defensive end.

As a freshman in 2004 he played in 8 games with 4 starts and was named The Sporting News All-Pacific-10 freshman team after recording 24 tackles (5.5 for losses) and 5 sacks. In 2005, he played in 7 games with no starts after suffering a broken leg in fall camp and missed the first five games of the season, in limited duty he recorded 13 tackles (1 for a loss) and 1 sack.
As a junior in 2006 he played in 9 games starting all 9 and recording 37 tackles (7.5 for losses) and 2.5 sacks. As a senior in 2007 he played in 12 games, starting all of them and made 40 tackles, 7 for losses and went without a sack.

Professional career

New York Jets 
He was signed by the Jets as an undrafted free agent in 2008 and spent the season on the team's practice squad. In 2009, Pitoitua posted three tackles in eight games. During the preseason in 2010, Pitoitua tore his Achilles tendon against the Carolina Panthers and was placed on the injured reserve list on August 23, 2010. Pitoitua was waived by the team on May 2, 2012.

Kansas City Chiefs 

Pitoitua was signed by the Kansas City Chiefs on May 8, 2012.

Tennessee Titans 
Pitoitua signed with the Tennessee Titans on March 25, 2013. Pitoitua and the Titans agreed to a new three-year contract on March 6, 2014. On August 28, 2016, Pitoitua was waived by the Titans.

References

External links 

 Washington State bio
 New York Jets bio
 Kansas City Chiefs bio

1985 births
Living people
American sportspeople of Samoan descent
Samoan emigrants to the United States
American football defensive tackles
American football defensive ends
Washington State Cougars football players
New York Jets players
Kansas City Chiefs players
Tennessee Titans players
Players of American football from American Samoa